The Chekhov Gymnasium in Taganrog on Ulitsa Oktyabrskaya 9 (formerly Gymnasicheskaya Street) is the oldest gymnasium in the South of Russia. Playwright and short-story writer Anton Chekhov spent 11 years in the school, which was later named after him and transformed into a literary museum. Visitors can see Anton's desk and his classroom, the assembly hall and even the punishment cell which he sometimes visited.

History of the school
The Boys Gymnasium was founded in 1809 and this building was completed in 1843 by the plans of the Italian architect Francesco Boffo. Students of the Boys Gymnasium benefited from various grants, most of them being introduced by the Greek-Russian merchant and benefactor Ioannis Varvakis (1745–1825). In mid-1870s a school church was made in the same building, and the cross may be seen on some old postcards.

After the Russian Revolution of 1917 and the following Civil War, the building housed a cavalry school (6th Cavalry College), frequently visited by Semyon Budyonny, Klim Voroshilov and Efim Shadenko.

During the Occupation of Taganrog in 1941-1943 used by the Germans as Sicherheitsdienst headquarters.

In 1954, the Boys Gymnasium was named after Anton Chekhov within the framework of events dedicated to the writer's 50th death anniversary memorial year.

In 1975 opened as The Literary Museum named after Anton Chekhov, more commonly known under the short name Chekhov Gymnasium.

January 29, 2010 President of Russian Federation Dmitri Medvedev held a meeting with representatives of the Russian and foreign theatrical communities in Taganrog at the stateroom of the Chekhov Gymnasium literary museum.

School years of Anton Chekhov

Anton Chekhov attended a school for Greek boys in Taganrog (1866-1868), and at the age of eight he was sent to the local grammar school (Gymnasium) where he proved an average pupil. Rather reserved and undemonstrative, he nevertheless gained a reputation for satirical comments, for pranks, and for making up humorous nicknames for his teachers. He enjoyed playing in amateur theatricals and often attended performances at the Taganrog Theatre. As an adolescent he tried his hand at writing short "anecdotes," amusing or funny stories, although he is also known to have written a serious long play at this time, "Fatherless," which he later destroyed. He received an annual grant of 300 rubles which had been introduced by the Taganrog City Council after the failed assassination attempt on the tsar Alexander II of Russia.

After the business of Anton Chekhov's father failed, the whole family left for Moscow in 1875-1876. Anton was left in Taganrog to care for himself and finish school. The future world-famous playwright survived selling off household goods and tutoring younger school students at the Boys Gymnasium. In 1879, Chekhov passed his final exams and joined his family in Moscow, where he had obtained scholarship to study medicine at the Moscow University.

The maths rating on Chekhov's school-leaving certificate was signed by Edmund Dzerzhinsky, father of the revolutionary Felix Dzerzhinsky. Dzerzhinsky gave lessons of mathematics in two of Taganrog's gymnasiums - the Girls Gymnasium of Empr. Maria (Мариинская женская гимназия) in 1868-1873 and in the Boys Gymnasium from 1873 until late seventies. Another contemporary instructor was Fyodor Pokrovski (Федор Платонович Покровский), who taught Chekhov theology and gave him the famous nickname Antosha Chekhonte (Антоша Чехонте).

Other famous graduates

Nikolay Chekhov, artist
Mikhail Chekhov, writer
Alexander Chekhov, writer
Dmitry Girs, writer
  Leonid Gobyato, Russian general, inventor of the first mortar
Nikolay Sherbina, poet
Ivan Martos, sculptor
  Alexander Leonidovich Vishnevsky, Russian and Soviet actor
Valentin Parnakh, poet, founder of the Soviet Jazz music
Isaac Yakovlevich Pavlovsky, journalist and writer
Konstantin Savitsky, artist
Vladimir Bogoraz, anthropologist and writer
Samuel Maykapar, composer
Nikolay Apollonovich Belelyubski, scientist, famous designer of bridges
Osip Notovich, writer
 Andrei Grechko, Soviet general, Marshal of the Soviet Union (graduate of the Cavalry College)
 Ivan Golubets, the first Hero of the Soviet Union in the Black Sea Fleet
Zinoviy Vysokovskiy, actor
Sergey Zvantsev, writer
Victor Dyomin, Soviet cinema critic, editor, writer
 Kuzma Galitsky, Soviet army general
  Vladimir Grigoryevich Zakharov, Soviet composer, People's Artist of the USSR, art director of Pyatnitsky Choir
 Yakov Rubanchik, Soviet architect

Museum
Today the Gymnasium is open to public as The Literary Museum named after Anton Chekhov (Литературный музей А.П.Чехова). After the famous Pushkin House museum in Saint Petersburg, this is the second-largest literary museum in Russia both in terms of space and unique funds. The exhibition includes the library that consists of the antique books of the time and books later sent by Anton Chekhov, his personal belongings, photographs, documents, autographs by Chekhov and other famous people - friends of the writer.

Gallery

Exterior

Inside the museum

References 
 Taganrog Encyclopedia (Энциклопедия Таганрога), 2nd edition, Taganrog, 2003
 История города Таганрога, П.П.Филевский, Москва, 1898
 По старой Греческой, Н.Гаврюшкин, Таганрог, 2003

See also 
 The Girls Gymnasium in Taganrog

Educational institutions established in 1809
Museums in Taganrog
Schools in Russia
School buildings completed in 1843
Gymnasiums in Russia
Anton Chekhov
Literary museums in Russia
1809 establishments in the Russian Empire
Cultural heritage monuments of regional significance in Rostov Oblast
Cultural heritage monuments in Taganrog